Paulding is an extinct town in Dunklin County, in the U.S. state of Missouri. The GNIS classifies it as a populated place.

A post office called Paulding was established in 1900, and remained in operation until 1918. The community took its name from the Paulding Stave Company.

References

Ghost towns in Missouri
Former populated places in Dunklin County, Missouri